The Confederation of African Football (CAF) is the governing body for association football in Africa. It organizes three club competitions: the CAF Champions League (formerly African Cup of Champions Clubs), the CAF Confederation Cup and the CAF Super Cup. CAF was also responsible for the African Cup Winners' Cup and the CAF Cup, until their merging in 2004 when Confederation Cup took their places. Together with Asian Football Confederation (AFC), it also organized the Afro-Asian Club Championship since 1986 to 1999.

Egyptian side Al Ahly have won a record total of 24 titles in CAF competitions, nine more than his local rival Zamalek and eleven more than Mazembe.

Until the first Confederation Cup final in 2005, the only team to win every CAF club competition was Espérance Sportive de Tunis (Tunisia). They won their first African Champions Cup in 1994, their first Cup Winners' Cup in 1998 and their first CAF Cup in 1997; becoming also the first team to win the set composed by the three oldest continental trophies, a feat subsequently equaled only by Algerian JS Kabylie in 2000 and Tunisian Étoile Sportive du Sahel in 2007. Additionally, ES Tunis won its first Super Cup in 1995 and its first Afro-Asian Club Championship Cup in the same year.

Egyptian clubs have won the most titles (41), ahead of clubs from Tunisia (24) and Morocco (24).

Club World Cup is not included in this list because it's a FIFA competition.

Winners

By club
Al Ahly have a record of 10 CAF Champions League titles, a record of 4 African Cup Winners' Cup titles and a record of 8 CAF Super Cup titles. JS Kabylie have a record of 3 CAF Cup titles. CS Sfaxien have a record of 3 CAF Confederation Cup titles. Zamalek have a record of 2 Afro-Asian Club Championship titles.

Until the first CAF Confederation Cup final in 2005, Espérance Sportive de Tunis was the only team to win every CAF club competitions.

Key

By country
The following table lists all the countries whose clubs have won at least one CAF competition. Egyptian clubs are the most successful, with a total of 41 titles. Egyptian clubs hold a record number of wins in the African Cup of Champions Clubs/CAF Champions League (16), the African Cup Winners' Cup (8), the CAF Super Cup (12) and the Afro-Asian Club Championship (3). In second place Tunisian clubs have 24 titles and they have the most victories in the CAF Cup (4). In third place overall, Moroccan clubs have secured 24 titles and they have the most victories in the CAF Confederation Cup (7).

Key

By region
Key

See also

CAF Champions League
African Cup Winners' Cup 
CAF Cup
CAF Confederation Cup
CAF Super Cup
Afro-Asian Club Championship

Notes

External links
CAF official website